Vasilyovo is a rural locality (a village) in Posyolok Zolotkovo, Gus-Khrustalny District, Vladimir Oblast, Russia. The population was 158 as of 2010.

Geography 
The village is located 14 km south from Zolotkovo, 49 km south-east from Gus-Khrustalny.

References 

Rural localities in Gus-Khrustalny District
Melenkovsky Uyezd